Crimes of the Future is a 2022 science fiction body horror drama film written and directed by David Cronenberg. The film stars Viggo Mortensen, Léa Seydoux and Kristen Stewart. It follows a performance artist duo (Mortensen and Seydoux) who perform surgery for audiences in a future where human evolution has accelerated for much of the population. Although the film shares its title with Cronenberg's 1970 film of the same name, it is not a remake as the story and concept are unrelated, and there is no connection between the two films whatsoever. The film marked Cronenberg's return to the science fiction and horror genres for the first time since Existenz (1999).

An international co-production of Canadian, French, British and Greek companies, Crimes of the Future had its world premiere at the 2022 Cannes Film Festival, where it competed for the Palme d'Or and received a six-minute standing ovation. The film received a theatrical release in France on May 25, 2022, opened in Canada on June 3, 2022, and had a same day limited release in the United States. It received generally positive reviews from critics.

Plot
At an unspecified future date, significant advances in biotechnology led to the invention of machines and (analogue) computers that can directly interface with and control bodily functions, which have become the norm. Simultaneously, humankind itself has experienced several biological changes of indeterminate origin. Most significant among these changes is the disappearance of physical pain and infectious disease for an overwhelming majority (allowing for surgery to be safely performed on conscious people in ordinary settings), but other humans experience more radical alterations to their physiology. One of them, an eight-year-old boy named Brecken, displays the innate ability to consume and digest plastics as food. Convinced that he is inhuman, Brecken's mother smothers him with a pillow, leaving his corpse to be found by her ex-husband Lang.

Saul Tenser and Caprice are a world-renowned performance artist couple. They take advantage of Tenser's "accelerated evolution syndrome", a disorder that forces his body to constantly develop new organs, by surgically removing them before a live audience. The syndrome leaves Tenser in constant pain and with severe respiratory and digestive discomfort; he is consequently reliant on several specialized biomechanical devices, including a bed, a machine through which Caprice performs surgery on him, and a chair that twitches and rotates as it assists him with eating. Tenser and Caprice meet with bureaucrats in charge of the National Organ Registry, a governmental office designed to uphold the state's restrictions on human evolution by cataloging and storing newly evolved organs. One of the bureaucrats, the nervy Timlin, becomes captivated by Tenser's artistic goals. At a successful show of Tenser's, she tells him that "surgery is the new sex", a sentiment that Tenser and many other characters appear to embrace as repetitive cutting seems to be replacing traditional sex and masturbation as the preferred means of sexual gratification.

A governmental police unit seeks to use Tenser to infiltrate a group of radical evolutionists. Without telling Caprice, Tenser meets a series of contacts through other biological performance art shows that lead him to the evolutionist cell. One of them, former cosmetic surgeon Nasatir, creates a zippered cavern in Tenser's stomach, which Caprice uses to access Tenser's organs in an oral sex act where she fellates his zipper wound and presumably his internal organs while he moans in erotic pleasure. Caprice continues to network with other performance artists, eventually choosing to receive decorative cosmetic surgery on her forehead.

Tenser meets with Timlin, who reveals to him the agenda of the evolutionists: they have chosen to modify their digestive system to make them able to eat plastics and other synthetic chemicals. Their principal food is a purple processed "candy bar" of toxic waste, fatally poisonous to others. Lang is the leader of the cell; his son Brecken had been born with the ability to eat plastic, proving the inaccuracy of the government's critical stance on human evolution. Timlin tries to initiate sex with Tenser, but he says he is not good at "the old sex".

Tenser is eventually approached by Lang, who wants Tenser and Caprice to reveal the cell's anti-government agenda through a public autopsy of Brecken that will highlight his evolved digestive system. After some deliberation, Tenser agrees. With Timlin, Lang, and many others watching, Tenser performs the autopsy, but it is revealed that Brecken's natural organ system has been surgically replaced. Lang flees the show in tears. Outside, he is approached by two agents who supposedly work for the corporation that manufactures Tenser's biomedical machines. Mimicking their earlier killing of Nasatir, they assassinate Lang by driving power drills into his head. Tenser's connection within the police unit admits that Timlin replaced Brecken's organs to keep the deviation in human evolution secret from the public. Saddened by Brecken and Lang's deaths, Tenser informs the police that he will no longer serve them, approvingly mentioning the cell's beliefs on evolution.

Tenser struggles to eat in his chair. He asks Caprice to give him a bar of plastic. As Caprice records him, he eats it, looks into Caprice's camera, and sheds a tear. His mouth twitches into a smile as the chair finally quiets.

Cast

Production
The film was a thriller set to begin production in early 2003 under the title Painkillers, which explored the world of performance art and took place in an anaesthetized society where pain is the new forbidden pleasure, and surgery and self-mutilation, being performed in public and on camera, have come to be regarded as the new sex. Ralph Fiennes was attached to star as Saul Tenser after Nicolas Cage, the first option for the main role, dropped out. It was intended to be shot in Toronto, Canada, on a budget of $35 million. ThinkFilm had picked up worldwide rights, with a scheduled release for late 2006 in North America. However, the project never entered production. In a mid-2000s interview, director David Cronenberg brushed the project aside, stating that it was not happening and that he had lost interest in making it anyway.

In February 2021, during an interview with GQ magazine, Viggo Mortensen revealed that he was working on a project with Cronenberg, saying: "Yes, we do have something in mind. It's something he wrote a long time ago, and he never got it made. Now he's refined it, and he wants to shoot it. Hopefully, it'll be this summer we'll be filming. I would say, without giving the story away, he's going maybe a little bit back to his origins". In April, Léa Seydoux and Kristen Stewart were among the cast announced for the film. Natalie Portman was initially supposed to play Seydoux's part (who initially was set to play Stewart's role), but she was unable to do the film because of conflicts related to COVID-19. In August 2021, Tanaya Beatty, Yorgos Karamihos, Nadia Litz and Yorgos Pirpassopoulos joined the cast of the film.

Principal photography began on August 2, 2021, and concluded on September 10, 2021 in Athens, Greece.

Reception

Box office
Crimes of the Future grossed $2.4 million in the United States and Canada, and $2 million in other territories, for a total worldwide gross of $4.5 million.

In the United States and Canada, the film earned $1.1 million from 773 theaters in its opening weekend, finishing tenth at the box office. It dropped out of the box office top ten in its second weekend with $374,131.

Home media
Crimes of the Future was released on 4K Ultra HD Blu-ray on January 31, 2023, from Decal Releasing, Neon Films and Distribution Solutions.

Critical response
On the review aggregator website Rotten Tomatoes, the film holds an approval rating of 80% based on 276 reviews, and an average rating of 6.7/10. The website's critics consensus reads, "Quintessential if not classic Cronenberg, Crimes of the Future finds the director revisiting familiar themes with typically unsettling flair". On Metacritic, the film has a weighted average score of 67 out of 100, based on 55 reviews, indicating "generally favorable reviews".

David Rooney of The Hollywood Reporter praised the performances of Mortensen and Seydoux but concluded that the film "offers up more mysteries than it solves." Todd McCarthy's review in Deadline Hollywood describes the film as "serious, elegant and provocative enough to cut it as an art film in the Cannes competition while also delivering the gross goods of body parts and exploitation film provocations. Not too many filmmakers can straddle the two, but Cronenberg still manages it pretty well."

The film was named to the Toronto International Film Festival's annual year-end Canada's Top Ten list for 2022.

Accolades

References

External links
 
 Crimes of the Future at Library and Archives Canada

2020s avant-garde and experimental films
2020s British films
2020s Canadian films
2020s English-language films
2020s French films
2020s horror drama films
2020s science fiction drama films
2022 films
2022 drama films
2022 science fiction horror films
British avant-garde and experimental films
British body horror films
British horror drama films
British science fiction drama films
British science fiction horror films
Canadian avant-garde and experimental films
Canadian body horror films
Canadian horror drama films
Canadian science fiction drama films
Canadian science fiction horror films
Davis Films films
English-language Canadian films
English-language French films
English-language Greek films
Films directed by David Cronenberg
Films scored by Howard Shore
Films set in the future
Films shot in Athens
French avant-garde and experimental films
French horror drama films
French science fiction drama films
French science fiction horror films
Greek avant-garde and experimental films
Greek drama films
Greek horror films
Serendipity Point Films films
Vertigo Films films